Kinross railway station was a temporary terminus that served the burgh of Kinross, Perth and Kinross, Scotland in 1860 on the Kinross-shire Railway.

History 
The station opened on 20 June 1860 by the North British Railway. It was a temporary terminus, closing on 20 September 1860 when the line was extended.

References

External links 

Disused railway stations in Perth and Kinross
Former North British Railway stations
Railway stations in Great Britain opened in 1860
Railway stations in Great Britain closed in 1860
1860 establishments in Scotland
1860 disestablishments in Scotland